Paul Naudet (1859–1929) was a French journalist and Catholic priest.

Works
Naudet wrote multiple books, some of which are:

Notre œuvre sociale (1894)
Mes souvenirs (1895)
Vers l’avenir (1896)
Le christianisme social, propriété, capital et travail (1898)
Notre devoir social, questions pratiques de morale individuelle et sociale (1899)
Premiers principes de sociologie catholique (1899)
La démocratie et les démocrates chrétiens (1900)

1859 births
1929 deaths
French journalists
French male non-fiction writers